Hanan Al-Fayyad (born 1976) is a Qatari academic and writer. She is a professor at Qatar University, and spokesperson for the Sheikh Hamad Award for Translation and International Understanding. She published a novel in 2014.

Works
 La karama fi al-hubb (No Dignity in Love), 2014.

References

1976 births
Living people
Qatari novelists
Qatari women writers
Academic staff of Qatar University